Pyaar Vali Love Story (Marathi :प्यार वाली Love Story) is a Marathi language film directed and written by Sanjay Jadhav which released in theatres on 24 October 2014, on the occasion of Diwali.

Starring Swwapnil Joshi and Sai Tamhankar in the lead roles, it also stars Upendra Limaye, Urmila Kanetkar-Kothare, Sameer Dharmadhikari, Nagesh Bhosale and others. The plot of the film is set in the 1990s. The film was one of the most awaited Marathi film

Plot
Pyar Vali Love Story presents stories of two lovers, who were of different religions. It is a story of two friends-Kadar and Pashya. Pashya's brother Amar loves Kadar's sister Aliya. Things take a turn after the murder of Inspector Alam.  Amar and Aliya face hurdles in their love story because of different religions and also when their brothers became enemies.

Cast
 Swwapnil Joshi as Amar
 Sai Tamhankar as Aliya
 Urmilla Kothare as Nandini
 Upendra Limaye as Kadar
 Sameer Dharmadhikari as Pashya
 Nagesh Bhosale as Aliya's Father
 Chinmay Mandlekar as Inspector Alam
 Jitendra Joshi 
 Sushant Shelar, Adarsh Shinde in a song "Jahan Jaau"

Soundtrack

Box office
It fared well on weekdays at the box office, and collected around  nett. in 2 weeks.

References

External links
 
 
 

2014 films
2010s Marathi-language films
Films directed by Sanjay Jadhav